Patrick J. Prendergast FIEI, MRIA, FREng is an engineer, specialised in bioengineering, and held a named professorial chair and other senior roles prior to his serving as the 44th Provost of Trinity College Dublin, the university's chief officer, for the 2011-2021 term. He has published more than 200 papers and volumes, and been cited widely.

Early life and education
Born in Enniscorthy, County Wexford, Ireland, Prendergast grew up in the nearby village of Oulart and received his secondary education at St Peter's College, Wexford. He then studied at Trinity College Dublin as an undergraduate, from 1983, completing a degree in Mechanical Engineering in 1987 and a PhD in 1991 titled Structural Analysis of the Artificial Hip Joint. He wrote an account of his undergraduate years in Trinity Tales. Trinity College Dublin in the Eighties.

Academic career
After post-doctoral positions in Bologna, Italy and Nijmegen, the Netherlands, he became a lecturer at Trinity in 1995, and was elected a Fellow of the College in 1998. Together with colleagues from medicine and dentistry, he established the Trinity Centre for Bioengineering in 2002, and was appointed to a Personal Chair in Bio-Engineering in 2007.  He is credited with adding biomechanics as a topic area to Trinity's engineering syllabus, and developing a Masters in Bioengineering.

He served as Dean of Graduate Studies in Trinity from 2004 to 2007, and was appointed Vice-Provost / Chief Academic Officer in 2008.

Research
Prendergast has published more than 200 articles and volumes, including on topics around medical engineering, such as tissue mechanobiology, and design of implants. His work has won funding from Science Foundation Ireland, often as Principal Investigator, as well as from the EU and some industry sources. He was a member of the Glion Colloquium of university Presidents where he published two papers on strategy and leadership.

Provostship
In 2011, he  was elected as the 44th Provost of Trinity College, for a ten-year term. For external purposes, the post is elaborated to Provost and President.  During his term, Prendergast has focused on the university's rankings from QS, the Times HES and Shanghai, and on increasing sources of funding.  

In September 2016 a "Provost's Council" was created, made up of alumni and benefactors of the university, it advises the Provost on how Trinity might advance, for example by financing new projects and initiatives. In November 2016, it was announced that Trinity College Dublin would be joining the League of European Research Universities (LERU). It is the first and only university on the island of Ireland to become a member. 

In May 2018, Prendergast unveiled plans for a new €60 million Institute in Engineering, Environment and Emerging Technologies (E3), funded by an Irish philanthropic donation and Government funding, and the E3 Learning Foundry is now under construction in the university. The renovation of the magnificent Old Library of Trinity College, with a €25m contribution announced by government Minister Darragh O’Brien of Fianna Fail, is also going ahead. However it is not known if a more a more controversial project to develop a new campus announced as Trinity East with the Grand Canal Innovation District will proceed.

In April 2019, Prendergast gave a wide-ranging interview to the music magazine Hot Press.  He was involved in several controversies, most notably over branding and "Take Back Trinity", a student movement to resist commercialisation within the university. He was often accused of being out of touch with student and staff concerns. Despite this he wrote a monthly article for the Irish Times on Higher Education espousing his views on how Irish higher education should develop, one of which proposed a Cabinet Minister and associated Department for Higher Education. This idea, considered far-fetched at the time, was implemented by the new Taoiseach Micheál Martin, his main change in the new government formation. Prendergast gave his last speech as Provost to Northern Ireland alumni advocating special measures for NI students not to have to pay the non-EU fee post-Brexit. The students’ final assessment of Prendergast was probably a good summary: “His trademark lack of regard for the on-the-ground effects of his decisions had a certain nobility to it. One may disagree with them, but at least there was no pretence of consensus building”.

Chairperson and Board memberships
Prendergast has a number of chairperson roles that bring him to public attention. In February 2022 he was appointed by Minister for Further and Higher Education, Research, Innovation and Science, Simon Harris as the Chairperson of the South East Technological University, a new university in Ireland. In this capacity he made some comments to the national media about student accommodation which has critical comment by architects. 

He was a member of the Board of the European Institute of Innovation and Technology (headquarters Budapest) for eight years. 

He is currently Chairperson of the Board of the Douglas Hyde Gallery of Contemporary Art and formerly chaired the Board of Science Gallery International.

Recognition
In 2009 Prendergast was awarded an ScD for published works in Bioengineering. He is a member of the Royal Irish Academy in the Sciences division, and since 2013, an International Fellow of the Royal Academy of Engineering. He gave the Wartenweiler Lecture of the International Society of Biomechanics in 2009, and the Richard Skalak Lecture of the Biomedical Engineering Department of Columbia University in 2014. For his scientific contributions he was made an Honorary Fellow of the Anatomical Society in 2016, and an Honorary Member of the European Society of Biomechanics in 2018.

In popular culture
Prendergast was portrayed by Frank Smith in the 2020 miniseries Normal People.

References

External links

Year of birth missing (living people)
People from Enniscorthy
People educated at St Peter's College, Wexford
Alumni of Trinity College Dublin
Members of the Royal Irish Academy
Provosts of Trinity College Dublin
Living people